Maneuver Support Vessel (Light) or MSV(L) is the US Army’s replacement for the Landing Craft Mechanized 8 (LCM-8 or “Mike Boat”) that had been in service since 1959.

Characteristics
 Length: 
 Top speed: 
 Range: 

The MSL(V) will be able to carry either one M1A2 Abrams tank, two Stryker armored vehicles with slat armor, or four Joint Light Tactical Vehicles with trailers.

Contract
In September 2017, the U.S. Army Contracting Command, Warren, Michigan entered into a contract with Vigor Shipyards for its Vancouver, Washington shipyard to produce the MSV(L). It is a firm fix-price contract for US$979,794,011 with an estimated completion date in 2027.

A prototype will be available in FY2019, then a further four in FY21 and FY22. Assuming full production is authorised, 32 will be built between FY23–27, for a total purchase of 36 MSV(L).

References

Landing craft
Ships of the United States Army